The TR RV class, later known as the EAR 21 class, was a class of  gauge steam locomotives designed and built for the Tanganyika Railway (TR) as a  development of the  TR MK class.  The eight members of the RV class were built by Vulcan Foundry, in Newton-le-Willows, Lancashire (now part of Merseyside), England.

The "RV" class designation was short for "River", as each RV class locomotive was named after a river in the Tanganyika Territory.  The class entered service on the TR between 1928 and 1930, and its members were later operated by the TR's successor, the East African Railways (EAR).

Class list
The builder's and fleet numbers, and names, of each member of the class were as follows:

See also

History of rail transport in Tanzania
Rail transport in Kenya
Rail transport in Uganda

References

Notes

Bibliography

External links

East African Railways locomotives
Metre gauge steam locomotives
Railway locomotives introduced in 1928
Steam locomotives of Kenya
Steam locomotives of Tanzania
Steam locomotives of Uganda
RV class
Vulcan Foundry locomotives
4-8-2 locomotives
Scrapped locomotives